The Amaichas were one of the 16 recognized Diaguitan communities in the province of Tucumán in northwestern Argentina.

References 

Diaguita
Indigenous peoples in Argentina